North Korean nationality law details the conditions in which an individual is a national of the Democratic People's Republic of Korea (DPRK), commonly known as North Korea.

History
Until 1963, the DPRK had no formal nationality law. This led to situations which were quite unusual from the perspective of international law, most notably the Soviet Union's unilateral declaration that the Sakhalin Koreans were DPRK citizens—in effect, one sovereign state granting its residents the citizenship of another sovereign state, presumably without any consultation.

The DPRK's first nationality law, passed on 9 October 1963, provided quite a broad definition of DPRK citizenship. Specifically, it stated that anyone who had citizenship of undivided Korea and had retained it up to the promulgation of the new citizenship law, as well as descendants of such persons, was thenceforth a citizen of the DPRK. This raised the possibility that every member of the Korean diaspora would be considered a DPRK citizen, as there had previously been no clear procedure for renunciation of Korean citizenship, and few had taken such an official step. The new law also established that foreigners could gain DPRK nationality by naturalisation. The law was amended on 23 March 1995.

The law permits multiple citizenship, and specifies that nationality treaties with other countries take precedence over the text of the law. Due to the lack of normal diplomatic relations between the DPRK and Japan, Koreans in Japan with dual citizenship of the DPRK and Japan have had their requests to renounce Japanese citizenship in favour of solely retaining DPRK citizenship refused by Japan's Justice Ministry. It is also legally possible to renounce DPRK nationality; the DPRK issues certificates of loss of nationality in such cases, which may be required by other states in which a former DPRK national seeks to naturalise. However, such certificates have become more difficult to obtain , according to South Korean media reports.

Naturalisation 
DPRK law prescribes that any person wishing to naturalise as a DPRK national should petition to the Supreme People's Assembly. As the SPA is a rubber-stamp legislature, actual naturalisation powers lie in whoever the Supreme Leader of North Korea is at the time. Naturalised North Koreans without Korean relatives would be granted the songbun "of foreign origin", and are not required to attend ideological training sessions.

There are four main groups of naturalised North Koreans: Soviet Koreans, the Hwagyo, Japanese wives of repatriated Zainichi, and those who have been naturalised individually.

See also 

Citizenship in North Korea
North Korean passport
Visa requirements for North Korean citizens
Visa policy of North Korea

Notes

References

External links
  
Unofficial English and Japanese translations of the Nationality Law of 1963

1963 in law